Los Siete de la Raza (The Seven of the Hispanic Community) was the label given to seven young Latinos from the Mission District of San Francisco, California who were involved in a 1969 altercation with police that left one officer dead. The incident and subsequent trial became a cause célèbre of the Latin-American community and the New Left. All seven were acquitted.

Incident
The young Central American men—Gary Lescallett, Rodolfo Antonio (Tony) Martinez, Mario Martinez, Jose Rios, Nelson Rodriguez, Danilo Melendez and George Lopez—were approached by plainclothes San Francisco Police Department officers Joe Brodnik and Paul McGoran while the former were moving a stereo or TV into a house at 429-433 Alvarado Street on May 1, 1969, at around 10:30 a.m. A struggle ensued and Brodnik was fatally shot with McGoran's gun. When police descended on the crime scene, they entered the house and assumed the suspects were hiding in the attic. As a police helicopter hovered overhead, they flooded the building with tear gas and sent a fire truck ladder up to the roof to facilitate the search while officer Brodnik's corpse lay untended on the sidewalk.

Three days later, six of the youths were arrested for Brodnik's murder, the attempted murder of McGoran, and burglary. The seventh, George Lopez, was never apprehended.

They were defended by the activist lawyers Charles Garry and Richard Hodge, lauded by left entities like Ramparts magazine. The young Latinos included four Salvadorans, one Nicaraguan, and one Honduran, some of whom had been involved in the youth group the Mission Rebels (founded in 1965); and later in pan-Latino organizations such as COBRA (Confederation of Brown Race for Action) at the College of San Mateo, and the Brown Berets, which was an organization founded by David Sanchez and Vickie Castro.

Trial
After the initial arrests, Los Siete spent several months in prison without bail.

During the pre-trial, there was outrage at the manner in which the young men had been subject to illegal search and seizure. Charles Garry served as an attorney during the case.

The trial began in late June 1970.

The prosecution maintained that one of the youths wrested McGoran's gun from him and shot Brodnik. Officer McGoran testified that they approached the youths and lined them up, then he struck one in the face and was jumped by "more than one assailant." The last thing he remembered hearing was Brodnik shouting, "Look out Paul, he's got your gun." The defense said McGoran pulled his gun and shot Brodnik during the struggle, and brought forth witnesses to testify to his and Brodnik's excessive use of force in previous incidents. McGoran denied drawing his gun. The defense tried to paint McGoran as a racist and alcoholic who tended to draw his gun during arrests. His estranged wife testified that her husband carried marijuana and other drugs on that he planted on suspects to ensure their convictions.

Furthermore, throughout the sixteen or so weeks of the trial, Los Siete and their team effectively defended themselves in court. Four of Los Siete, Jose Rios, Mario Martinez, Tony Martinez, and Danilo “BeBe” Melendez took the stand. Through their testimonies, they increasingly unraveled the charges made against them as each of their recollections of the incident were shown to match up. The prosecution case, which was led by District Attorney Thomas Norman, and the charges made against Los Siete were invalided.

Eventually all seven defendants were acquitted.

Yolanda López was the designer for the poster that was used during the trial of Los Siete de la Raza.

It is also important to note that court sessions were widely attended by other young radicals, including Black Panther Huey P. Newton and two of the Chicago Seven.

Officer Background 
The Mission District used to be known for its Irish, Italian, and German immigrant population during the early 1900s up until the late 1940s due to the State of California's mass Latinx immigration and mass immigration in general. Both Officer McGoran and Officer Brodnik in fact grew up in the Mission District during their early years in 1930s-1940s. Both men attended Mission High, Brodnick was known for his basketball skills which ultimately lead Mission High to its first championship in 50 years. Once Brodnick married he decided to move to the outskirts of the Mission District and joined the SanFransisco Police Department in 1956. On the other hand, McGoran was a Vietanm veteran and a retired United Air Lines mechanic.

McGoran and Brodnick were known to be notorious in the community. McGoran was known to be a heavy drinker and was quick to draw his gun. They were constantly harassing the people of the neighborhood, Officer Brodnick allegedly would carry a rubber hose with him although unclear if it were used during beatings. Their reputation was developed through the San Francisco State University Strike due to the beatings they were giving protestors along with arresting them.

Activism 
The "Los Siete" Defense Committee, housed near 24th and South Van Ness, raised support for the seven Mission District youths and obtained assistance from the Black Panther Party. The La Raza Information Center began operating in the summer of 1970 in the vacant storefront next to "Los Siete". It ran many programs, including Centro de Salud, which offered free bilingual services that eventually put pressure on public hospitals in the area to do the same.

It also ran a free breakfast program, a community newspaper, and its main program, the "Los Siete" Defense Committee.

Connections to Other Activist Groups 
Huey P. Newton, co-founder of the Black Panther Party, frequently worked with Los Siete and the Brown Berets. In a message written in Basta Ya! Huey wrote "I want you to know that the Black Panther Party and the Black Community is behind you in your struggle 100%... It is our intention to help you in everything possible until set free."

References

Further reading
 Heins, Marjorie. Strictly Ghetto Property: The Story of Los Siete de la Raza (Berkeley: Ramparts, 1972). 
 Ferreira, Jason. Venceremos!: Los Siete de La Raza and Third World Radicalism in San Francisco, 1969–1975. Department of Ethnic Studies, University of California, Berkeley

External links
 Los Siete de La Raza film
 La Raza Community Resource Center

1969 in California
1970 in California
Hispanic and Latino American culture in San Francisco
Race and law in the United States
Mission District, San Francisco
History of San Francisco
San Francisco Police Department